USS Pensacola (AK-7/AG-13) was a cargo ship in the United States Navy.

Pensacola was originally the German screw steamer Nicaria, launched in Rostock, Germany on  18 August 1901. She was seized by the U.S. government at Southport, North Carolina, on 8 May 1917. She was transferred to the United States Navy on 9 June 1917, and commissioned on 8 October 1917.

Assigned to the Naval Overseas Transport Service in January 1918, Pensacola carried supplies from the United States to French and British ports. Returning from Brest to Philadelphia on 2 December 1918, she steamed to New York and sailed for Turkey on 25 January 1919 with a cargo for the Syrian-Armenian Relief, arriving at Constantinople on 12 March. Following her return to the United States on 15 April, Pensacola carried passengers and cargo to bases in the Caribbean. Returning to Norfolk on 9 June 1919, she was reassigned to the Navy Trans-Pacific transport service.

She operated in the Pacific until becoming a station ship at Guam 15 March 1922.  Classified AK-7 (Cargo Ship) on 17 July 1920, Pensacola was reclassified AG-13 (Miscellaneous Auxiliary) on 26 June 1922.

She decommissioned at Mare Island, California on 14 March 1925, was struck from the Navy Register the same day, and was sold to M. Davidson of Stockton, California, on 5 August 1925.

References

External links
  NavSource Online: SP-2078 / AK-7 / AG-13 Pensacola

Ships built in Rostock
Ships of the Hamburg America Line
1901 ships
Cargo ships of the United States Navy

ja:トーテュガ (ドック型揚陸艦)